Guillermo de la Dehesa Romero (born July 9, 1941 in Madrid) is a Spanish lawyer, economist, politician and businessman. Since leaving politics in 1988 he has been an international advisor to Goldman Sachs.

Biography
Guillermo de la Dehesa was born in Madrid on July 9, 1941. He was educated at Colegio del Pilar, and studied law at the Complutense University of Madrid. After passing the Técnico Comercial y Economista del Estado in 1968, de la Dehesa held various positions in the central government, in both the ministries of commerce, energy, industry and economics and the Bank of Spain. Under the governments of the Socialist Workers' Party (PSOE), he rose to the position of Secretary of State of Economy and Finance (1986-1988).

De la Dehesa joined the private sector in 1988, serving as Chief Executive Officer of Banco Pastor, President of Gas Madrid, and Consultant to Ibersuizas, Unión Fenosa and Telepizza. De la Dehesa is currently an international advisor to Goldman Sachs, Vice President of Amadeus IT Group, Non-Executive Chairman of Aviva Corporation, Member of the European Advisory Board of Eli Lilly and Company and an Independent Director and Member of the Executive Committee of Banco Santander. He is also Chairman of the Board of the Museo Nacional Centro de Arte Reina Sofía, and a patron of the Museo del Prado and the Círculo de Bellas Artes. De la Dehesa is a regular contributor to the newspaper El País and an author of several textbooks on economics. He is a member of the Group of Thirty.

References

External links
 Website

1941 births
Living people
Lawyers from Madrid
Spanish economists
20th-century Spanish lawyers
Spanish bankers
Complutense University of Madrid alumni
Goldman Sachs people
Group of Thirty
Central bankers
Spanish Socialist Workers' Party politicians
Members of the Board of Directors of the Banco Santander